The discography of Carole King, an American singer-songwriter and musician, consists of 17 studio albums, four live albums, seven compilation albums, one soundtrack album and 33 singles as a lead artist. 

King has sold over 75 million records worldwide. Billboard ranked her as the 73rd greatest artist of all time. Her second album, Tapestry (1971), was the world's best-selling album by a female artist for a quarter-century, with global sales of 30 million. According to the Recording Industry Association of America, King has sold 19.6 million records in the United States. She is also recognized as the most successful female songwriter of the 20th century, having written or co-written 118 hits on the Billboard Hot 100. Official Charts named King as the most successful female songwriter on the UK, penning 61 hits between 1952 and 2005 in the country.

Albums

Studio albums

Live albums

Compilation albums

Soundtrack albums

Singles

As lead artist

Collaborations

Video albums

See also 

 Tapestry Revisited: A Tribute to Carole King
 Marcia Sings Tapestry
 Beautiful: The Carole King Musical

References

Discographies of American artists
Pop music discographies
Folk music discographies
Rock music discographies
Discography